Monika Żur (born 22 April 1993) is a Polish professional racing cyclist. She rode in the women's road race at the 2015 UCI Road World Championships.

References

External links

1993 births
Living people
Polish female cyclists
Place of birth missing (living people)
Cyclists at the 2010 Summer Youth Olympics
Cyclists at the 2015 European Games
European Games competitors for Poland
21st-century Polish women